This is a list of the human spaceflight missions conducted by the Russian Federal Space Agency since 1992.  All Russian human spaceflight missions thus far have been carried out using the Soyuz vehicle, and all visited either Mir or the International Space Station.

The Russian Federal Space Agency was the successor to the Soviet space program. Numeration of the Soyuz flights therefore continues from previous Soviet Soyuz launches.  For previous flights of the Soyuz and other crewed space vehicles, see List of Soviet human spaceflight missions.

March 1992 – April 2002

October 2002 – June 2010

October 2010 – March 2016

July 2016 to present

Future crewed flights

Notes
1 Commercially funded cosmonaut or other "spaceflight participant".

References

See also
 List of Progress flights, with all flights of the Progress resupply craft that is based on the Soyuz

Human spaceflight programs
Russian human spaceflight missions
Vostok program
Voskhod program
Soyuz program
 
Russian